Beckingham is a village and civil parish in the North Kesteven district of Lincolnshire, England. The population of the civil parish (including Stapleford) at the 2011 census was 452.

Beckingham is largely a residential community with a village hall. The village public house is the Grade II listed Pack Horse Inn. Nearby to the west is Newark Golf Course.

The Grade I listed parish church is dedicated to All Saints. It was restored in 1857, 1888, and 1889–90. The church was featured on the BBC TV programme Restoration in 2006, where it became a regional runner-up. Further listed buildings are The Old Smithy, Sutton Lane Farmhouse, Beckingham Hillside Cottages, Glebe Farmhouse, Apricot Hall, Rose Cottages, The Rectory, and Redvers House,

In 1972 the village was bypassed by a dual-carriageway at a cost of £600,000.

Notable People
The Sheffield Tigers Speedway rider (1968  1972) - Brian Maxted.

References

External links

 Village website
 All Saints Church

Villages in Lincolnshire
Civil parishes in Lincolnshire
North Kesteven District